BC Khimki is a Russian professional basketball team that is based in Khimki, Moscow Oblast. The club's senior men's first team participates in the Russian Basketball Super League 1. The club's full official name is BC Khimki Moscow Region. Khimki has a Moscow-based rivalry with the Russian club CSKA Moscow.

History
BC Khimki was founded on January 5, 1997, and won the first seasons' championship of its regional league, to earn a place in the Russian Superleague A. The following year, Khimki positioned itself among the top 10 basketball clubs in Russia, guaranteeing a place in the 3rd-tier European cup competition, the FIBA Korać Cup. There, the team competed against a group of defeated leaders of the Turkish Super League, YUBA Liga, and Bulgarian League.

The team remained in a middle position in the Russian Super League until the 2002–03 season. That year the club finished in fourth place in the Russian Super League. During the subsequent years, the Russian high society behind the club decided to make the roster stronger, by signing players such as Gianmarco Pozzecco, Óscar Torres, and Rubén Wolkowyski.

The team then participated several times in European-wide continental tournaments, like the 3rd-tier level FIBA EuroChallenge and the 2nd-tier level EuroCup. In 2006, Khimki played in the EuroChallenge's championship game, against Joventut Badalona. On 7 October 2006, Khimki played in a game against the NBA club the Los Angeles Clippers, losing by a score of 98 to 91.

Khimki won the Russian Cup title in 2008, and played in the EuroCup championship game in 2009. The team played in the European 1st-tier level EuroLeague, for the first time in the 2009–10 season, and also played in the EuroLeague during the 2010–11 season and the 2012–13 season. The team also won the EuroCup championship in 2012 and 2015.

Arenas

Khimki plays its VTB United League and EuroCup home games at the 4,000 seat Khimki Basketball Center. In the 2015–16 season, Khimki played its EuroLeague home games at the 5,000 seat Krylatskoye Sports Palace. For the 2017–18 season, Khimki began playing its home EuroLeague games at the 7,280 seat Mytishchi Arena.

Club identity

Logos
On August 9, 2016, Khimki adopted a new logo to celebrate its 20th anniversary.

Season by season

Notes:
 In 2013, the VTB United League replaced the PBL as Russia's first tier league.

Titles and honours

Domestic competitions
Russian Championship (RSL / PBL / VTB):
Runners-up (11): 2006, 2008, 2009, 2010, 2011, 2012, 2013, 2015, 2017, 2018, 2019
Russian Cup:
Winners (1): 2008
Runners-up (1): 2006

Regional competitions
VTB United League:
Winners (1): 2011
Runners-up (4): 2015, 2017, 2018, 2019

European competitions
EuroCup:
Winners (2): 2012, 2015
Runners-up (1):  2009
FIBA EuroChallenge:
Runners-up (1): 2006

Other competitions
Sevilla, Spain Invitational Game:
Winners (1): 2009
Fuenlabrada, Spain Invitational Game:
Winners (1): 2009
Trofeo Costa de Sol
Winners (1): 2015
Gomelsky Cup:
Winners (1): 2017

Players

Current roster

Notable players

Head coaches
  Kęstutis Kemzūra
  Sergio Scariolo
  Rimas Kurtinaitis
  Duško Ivanović
  Georgios Bartzokas

See also
Moscow Basketball derby

References

External links

 
Euroleague.net Team Profile
Eurobasket.com Team Profile

 
Basketball teams in Russia
Basketball teams established in 1997
Sport in Moscow Oblast
BC
1997 establishments in Russia
EuroLeague clubs